The FIFA World Cup is an international association football competition contested by the men's national teams of the members of Fédération Internationale de Football Association (FIFA), the sport's global governing body. The championship has been awarded every four years since the first tournament in 1930, except in 1942 and 1946, due to World War II.

The tournament consists of two parts, the qualification phase and the final phase (officially called the World Cup Finals). The qualification phase, which currently take place over the three years preceding the Finals, is used to determine which teams qualify for the Finals. The current format of the Finals involves 32 teams competing for the title, at venues within the host nation (or nations) over a period of about a month. The World Cup Finals is the most widely viewed sporting event in the world, with an estimated 715.1 million people watching the 2006 tournament final.

Bulgaria has appeared in the finals of the FIFA World Cup on seven occasions, the first being at the 1962 tournament. They appeared in the FIFA World Cup subsequently in 1966, 1970, 1974, 1986, 1994 and 1998. Their best performance was in 1994, where they finished in fourth place. They have failed to qualify for a FIFA World Cup since 1998.

Record at the FIFA World Cup
Bulgaria's first appearance at the World Cup was at the seventh edition of the tournament in 1962. Between 1962 and 1974, they participated at four consecutive World Cup tournaments but did not survive the first round. Their best result followed in 1994, where they reached the semi-finals.

*Draws include knockout matches decided via penalty shoot-out

By Match

Record by Opponent

Tournament Summary

1962 FIFA World Cup

 England finished ahead of Argentina on goal average.

1966 FIFA World Cup

1970 FIFA World Cup

All times local (UTC−6)

Assistant referees:
Abel Aguilar Elizalde (Mexico)
Yoshiyuki Maruyama (Japan)

Assistant referees:
Guillermo Velasquez (Colombia)
Antonio Saldanha Ribeiro (Portugal)

Assistant referees:
Tofiq Bahramov (Soviet Union)
Laurens van Ravens (Netherlands)

1974 FIFA World Cup

1986 FIFA World Cup
Bulgaria qualified for the World Cup in Mexico by finishing second in Group Four, behind France with 11 points, but worse goal difference, ahead of the teams of Yugoslavia, East Germany, and Luxembourg. This was their fifth World Cup appearance. They were drawn in Group A with Italy, Argentina, and South Korea. In the opening match of the World Cup, the Bulgarians held the defending champions Italy to a 1–1 draw. Alessandro Altobelli gave the Italians the lead, but an 85th-minute equalizer by Nasko Sirakov gave the Bulgarians the point. The next match was another 1–1 draw against South Korea with the goal for Bulgaria coming from Plamen Getov in the 11th minute. They lost the final match of the group 2–0 against Argentina, who ended up winning the tournament. Despite not recording a win, the Bulgarians advanced to the knockout stage by being the third-best third placed team. That way, Bulgaria and also Uruguay became the first nations to qualify for the knockout stage without winning a game in the first round. In the Round of 16, they faced World Cup hosts Mexico and lost the match 2–0. Ivan Vutsov was the manager of the team.

1994 FIFA World Cup
Certainly one of the most important dates in Bulgarian football history is 17 November 1993, when Emil Kostadinov scored two goals to beat France in Paris, allowing Bulgaria to qualify for the World Cup in the United States in 1994. Under the management of Dimitar Penev, the Bulgarians, led by players such as Hristo Stoichkov, Yordan Letchkov, and Krasimir Balakov — along with a multitude of other talented players remembered in Bulgaria as the "Golden Generation" — made a strong impression by reaching the semi-finals. They entered Group D with Argentina, Nigeria, and Greece. Before that, the Bulgarians hadn't won a single match in five World Cup finals appearances. The first match ended with a 3–0 defeat by Nigeria. Despite the bad start, the team won 4–0 against World Cup-debuting featherweights Greece and 2–0 against Argentina. Argentina had actually been winning the group going into injury-time. A 91st-minute strike from Nasko Sirakov, however, meant that they dropped two places and finished third. Bulgaria continued to the next round, where they faced Mexico. The match ended 1–1 and after no goals were scored in extra time, penalties would decide which team would go through. Team captain Borislav Mihaylov made a good performance saving two of the penalty kicks. Bulgaria won 3–1 on penalties with Mihaylov becoming the hero for the Bulgarian team. In the quarter-finals, Bulgaria faced Germany. Lothar Matthäus scored from a penalty. The Bulgarians, however, managed to turn the game over with two goals by Hristo Stoichkov and Yordan Letchkov, giving them a 2–1 win and recording one of the most memorable wins for the team. Millions of Bulgarians celebrated this win in the Bulgarian capital city of Sofia and other Bulgarian cities. Having reached the semi-finals, this was the best Bulgarian performance in the World Cup. In the semi-finals, they lost 2–1 to Italy.  The third-place match was lost to Sweden, 4–0, and Bulgaria eventually finished in fourth place.  Hristo Stoichkov was awarded the Golden Boot as the top scorer in the tournament with six goals (shared with Oleg Salenko). Krasimir Balakov was named in the all-star team along with Stoichkov.
Starting 11: GK-Mihaylov(c); RB-Kiryakov/Kremenliev, CB/SW-Hubchev, CB-Ivanov, LB-Tsvetanov; DM-Yankov, CM-Lechkov, CM-Balakov, AM/CF-Sirakov/Borimirov; CF/RW-Kostadinov, CF/LW-Stoichkov.

All times local (EDT/UTC–4, CDT/UTC–5, PDT/UTC–7)

Assistant referees:
Gordon Dunster (Australia)
Eugene Brazzale (Australia)
Fourth official:
Ali Bujsaim (United Arab Emirates)

Assistant referees:
Abdulla Al Ghattan (Bahrain)
Raimundo Calix Garcia (Honduras)
Fourth official:
Arturo Angeles (United States)

Assistant referees:
Tapio Yli-Karro (Finland)
El Jilali Rharib (Morocco)
Fourth official:
Lim Kee Chong (Mauritius)

1998 FIFA World Cup
Bulgaria qualified for the World Cup in France by finishing first in the Group 5, followed by Russia. They entered the competition with a new manager Hristo Bonev, since Dimitar Penev was sacked after Euro 1996. Bulgaria drew Spain, Nigeria, and Paraguay in Group D. The first match ended in a 0–0 goalless draw against Paraguay. In the second match, the Bulgarians lost 1–0 for a second-straight World Cup to Nigeria. The final match ended with a disappointing 6–1 defeat to Spain. Following the bad results, Bulgaria finished fourth in the group, with only one point, and didn't go through the next round. This was the last major appearance at World Cup level for Bulgaria.

Assistant referees:
Achmat Salie (South Africa)
Hussain Ghadanfari (Kuwait)
Fourth official:
Nikolai Levnikov (Russia)

Assistant referees:
Jorge Diaz Galvez (Chile)
Arnaldo Pinto (Brazil)
Fourth official:
Marcio Rezende (Brazil)

Assistant referees:
Nicolae Grigorescu (Romania)
Claudio Rossi (Argentina)
Fourth official:
Nikolai Levnikov (Russia)

Record players

Top goalscorers

Individual Awards
 Golden Boot 1994: Hristo Stoichkov (shared)
 Bronze Ball 1994: Hristo Stoichkov

References

External links
 Bulgaria at FIFA
 World Cup Finals Statistics

 
Countries at the FIFA World Cup
Bulgaria national football team